VOA Indonesia may mean:-

Voice Of America Indonesia - the radio service
VOA Indonesia - the Visa On Arrival policy in Indonesia